"Miracle" is a bubblegum pop dance song by South Korean boy group Super Junior (then branded as Super Junior 05). It was written by Yoon Hyo-sang, Daniel Pandher and Tommy La Verdi for the group's first album, Twins (2005). The song was mixed by Lee Sung-hoo of SM Yellow Tail Studio and it was originally published by Orec Songs, with the support of BMG Music Publishing Korea. The original title of the song being "Life Couldn't Get Better."

Overview
"Miracle" was first made available as part of Super Junior 05's debut album Twins on December 5, 2005. The song became their second promotional single for the album after "Twins (Knock Out)", with the first performance of the track taking place on February 12, 2006 on SBS's Inkigayo. Promotional performances for the track began on February 14, 2006, soon following the release of the single's music video on February 24. "Miracle" is Super Junior's third performing single after "Twins (Knock Out)" and "Show Me Your Love." 

It was also the second song produced by SM Entertainment that topped overseas music charts in Thailand of Channel V, the first being TVXQ's "Rising Sun." Promotional activities for "Miracle" continued well throughout March and April until the release of their first official single, "U" in May.

Reception
The single topped Airplay charts and remained #1 for three consecutive weeks.

Cover version
A Mandarin cover of "Miracle" was performed by Super Junior 05's Mandopop sub-unit, Super Junior-M, which was released in Super Junior-M's debut album, Me (2008). The dance break in the song is slightly remixed and a bass vocal is added to complement the main vocals of the song. The Chinese title is translated to "You Are My Miracle."

Credits

Super Junior 05
Leeteuk – vocals (main)
Heechul – vocals (main)
Han Geng – vocals (main, chorus)
Yesung – vocals (main, chorus)
Kangin – vocals (main, chorus)
Shindong – vocals (chorus)
Sungmin – vocals (main, chorus)
Eunhyuk – vocals (chorus)
Donghae – vocals (main, chorus)
Siwon – vocals (main, chorus)
Ryeowook – vocals (main, chorus)
Kibum – vocals (main, chorus)

Crew
Daniel Pandher – composition, arrangement
Tommy La Verdi – composition, arrangement
Yoon Hyo-sang – lyricist
Lee Jae-myung – arrangement 
SM Entertainment – executive producer

References

2007 singles
Super Junior songs
SM Entertainment singles
Korean-language songs
2005 songs